The Gateway of Europe is a Polish historical film. It was released in 1999. In 2001, it received Polish Film Awards for Best Cinematography, Best Costume Design and Best Production Design.

Plot
In January 1918, three volunteer nurses came to the field hospital and Polish Corps located in the manor in Ciechinicze (Cichinicze) between Rahačoŭ and Babrujsk. Sophie, one of the nurses, finds her previously missing brother. When the hospital gets into the hands of the Bolsheviks, the sisters must cope not only with patient care, but also the brutality of the enemy soldiers.

Cast 

 Alicja Bachleda-Curuś as Zosia
 Kinga Preis as Hala
 Henryk Boukołowski as Dr Mroczek
 Agata Buzek as Henrietta
 Piotr Szwedes as Smagły
 Małgorzata Rudzka as Lasiewska
Agnieszka Sitek − Ira
Mariusz Bonaszewski − dr Lesiewski
Piotr Szwedes − Smagły
Piotr Adamczyk − Sztyller
Katarzyna Groniec − Niewidoma
Magda Teresa Wójcik − Kobieta
Jan Kozaczuk − Staszewicz
Piotr Rzymyszkiewicz − kolega Staszewicza
Andriej Jegorow − Andriej Anczew
Aleksander Kalinowski − Rudy
Michał Breitenwald − Żyd
Jerzy Mularczyk − ranny

References

External links
 

1999 films
Polish historical films
1990s Polish-language films
Films set in 1918
1990s historical films